Pietro Alemanno ( 1430 – 1497 or 1498) was an Italian-Austrian painter of the Renaissance period.

He was born in Göttweig (Austria) and died in Ascoli Piceno. He trained with Carlo Crivelli. 

In 1484, Alemanno painted a fresco of the Annunciation for the Palazzo Communale in Ascoli, in which he shows the figures in front of an elaborate architectural setting. In 1489 he painted an altarpiece of Virgin and Child between SS. Michael, Biaise, Jerome, and Nicholas  for the church of Santa Maria della Carita. There are a number of his works in the Pinacoteca Civica Fortunato Duranti.

Gallery

References

Sources

1430s births
1490s deaths
15th-century Italian painters
Italian male painters
Renaissance painters